"Bluebirds over the Mountain" is a song written and recorded in 1958 by Ersel Hickey, later covered by artists such as The Beach Boys, Ritchie Valens and Robert Plant. Hickey's original recording of the song peaked at No. 75 on the Billboard Top 100 Sides on the week ending May 10, 1958, and No. 39 on the Cash Box chart. Ritchie Valens' cover version was released on his eponymous 1959 album. A 1962 recording by The Echoes hit No. 112 on Billboard Bubbling Under Hot 100 Singles survey and was a top 20 hit on Chicago's WLS.

The Beach Boys version

"Bluebirds over the Mountain" was covered by the Beach Boys and released as a single under the Capitol Records label on November 29, 1968, in the United Kingdom (acquired and published by Northern Songs) and December 2, 1968, in the United States with the B-side "Never Learn Not to Love". The song features Mike Love on lead vocals and Ed Carter on guitar.

The single peaked at No. 61 on the Billboard chart and No. 56 on the Cashbox sales chart. It also peaked at No. 33 on the UK Singles Chart on the week ending January 8, 1969. In the Netherlands, it peaked at No. 9 each on the Dutch Top 40 on the week ending January 18, 1969, and the Dutch Single Top 100 on the week ending January 25, 1969.

Personnel
Credits from Craig Slowinski

The Beach Boys
Al Jardine - backing vocals, acoustic guitar
Mike Love - lead vocals
Carl Wilson - backing vocals, electric and acoustic guitars, producer
Bruce Johnston - backing vocals, organ, producer

Session musicians
Ed Carter - lead guitar
Daryl Dragon - marimba, vibraphone
Jim Gordon - drums
Larry Knechtel - bass
Mike Kowalski - bongos, additional percussion
Van McCoy - string and horn arrangements

References

1958 songs
1968 singles
Songs written by Ersel Hickey
The Beach Boys songs
Dick and Dee Dee songs
Ritchie Valens songs
Song recordings produced by Carl Wilson
Song recordings produced by Bruce Johnston
Capitol Records singles